Abercrombie may refer to:

People
 Abercrombie Lawson (1870–1927), botanist and professor

 Abercrombie (surname) (list of people with the family name Abercrombie)

Places

Americas
 Abercrombie, North Dakota, United States, city in Richland County
 Abercrombie, Nova Scotia, Canada
 Abercrombie Mountain, Washington, United States
 Abercrombie Township, Richland County, North Dakota, United States
 Abercrombie, Alabama, a place in Alabama, United States
 Abercrombie, Texas, unincorporated community in Texas, United States
 Fort Abercrombie, in North Dakota, United States

Oceania
 Abercrombie Caves, New South Wales, Australia
 Abercrombie River, New South Wales, Australia
 Abercrombie, New South Wales
 Abercrombie, Tasmania
 Abercrombie House, in Bathurst, New South Wales, Australia

Other places
 Abercrombie, Fife, village in Fife, Scotland
 Abercrombie Crests, rock summits in Antarctica

Ships
 Abercrombie-class monitor, a class of monitors that served in the Royal Navy during the First World War
 HMS Abercrombie, the name of three ships of the Royal Navy
 USS Abercrombie (DE-343), a US Navy John C. Butler-class destroyer escort of World War II

Other
 Abercrombie & Fitch, an American apparel chain
Abercrombie & Kent, luxury travel company
 Abercrombie (horse) (1975–2000), a bay harness racing horse
 Lord Abercrombie, a title peerage in Scotland
 Operation Abercrombie, 1942 raid on Hardelot, France
 Sir Ralph Abercromby (pub), a pub in Manchester

See also
 Abercromby (disambiguation)
 Abercrombie Plan (disambiguation)